Russell Conwell "Jing" Johnson (October 9, 1894 – December 6, 1950) was a pitcher in Major League Baseball who played for the Philadelphia Athletics. He played in five seasons for the Athletics in three separate stints, –,  and –. The first gap was due to Johnson's service in World War I, while the second, seven-year gap was precipitated by a salary dispute with Athletics owner Connie Mack, during which Johnson worked as a research chemist.

Jing was an alumnus of Ursinus College in Pennsylvania, where he later served as athletic director. He died in an automobile accident in Pottstown, Pennsylvania.

References

External links

1894 births
1950 deaths
Major League Baseball pitchers
Philadelphia Athletics players
Lehigh Mountain Hawks baseball coaches
Ursinus Bears athletic directors
Ursinus Bears baseball players
American military personnel of World War I
People from Chester County, Pennsylvania
Baseball players from Pennsylvania
Ursinus College alumni
Military personnel from Pennsylvania
Road incident deaths in Pennsylvania
Baltimore Orioles (IL) players
Allentown Dukes players